Javier Azagra Labiano  (24 January 1923 – 16 November 2014) was a Spanish Prelate of the Catholic Church.

Labiano was born in Pamplona, Spain and ordained a priest on 23 July 1950. He was appointed auxiliary bishop of the Diocese of Cartagena, as well as titular bishop of Lacubaza on 17 July 1970 and ordained on 8 October 1970. He was appointed bishop of the Diocese of Cartagena 23 September 1978 and retired from the post on 20 February 1998. He died on 16 November 2014.

References

External links
Catholic-Hierarchy
Cartagena Diocese

20th-century Roman Catholic bishops in Spain
21st-century Roman Catholic bishops in Spain
Bishops of Cartagena
1923 births
2014 deaths
Spanish Roman Catholic bishops